ART Municipal Jalapa is a Nicaraguan football team playing at the top level. It is based in Jalapa.

They currently play in the Primera División, playing their home matches at the 1,000 Estadio Alejandro Ramos.

History
After the demise of Deportivo Jalapa in 2007, a new club was formed in 2011 naming themselves Municipal Jalapa ART. The club won both the 2012 Apertura and 2013 Clausura title to earn promotion to the first division for the first time in their history and the first time a team from Jalapa appeared in the Primera division in six years.

In their very first season, despite only having one foreign player in Honduran Luis Maradiaga, the club was able to finish in fifth place just missing the semi final spot by 2 points.

Achievements
Segunda División de Nicaragua: 2
 2012 Apertura, 2013 Clausura

Current squad
As of:

Personnel

Current technical staff

List of Managers
  Leonidas Rodríguez (2012 – December 2014)
  Tyrone Acevedo (January 2015– January 2016)
  Ángel Orellana (Jan 2016-)
  Leonidas Rodríguez (2017- October 2019)
  Angel Orellana (October 2019 - May 2020)
  Carlos Javier Martino (May 2020 - April 2021)
  Leonidas Rodríguez (May 2021 - December 2021)
  Jose Ramon Romero (December 2021 - Present)

References

External links
 http://www.futbolnica.net/component/content/article/13-destacadas/785-el-regreso-de-un-grande-del-futbol-nicaragueense

Football clubs in Nicaragua
2011 establishments in Nicaragua
Association football clubs established in 2011